Isaac W. Sprague (May 21, 1841 – January 5, 1887) was an entertainer and sideshow performer, billed as the living human skeleton.

Biography
He was born on May 21, 1841, in East Bridgewater, Massachusetts.

Although normal for most of his childhood, Sprague began irreversibly losing weight at age 12 after feeling ill after swimming. The weight loss continued throughout his life despite having a healthy appetite. His condition has been described by historians as extreme progressive muscular atrophy. This ultimately led to his death.

Isaac bounced around from job to job during early adulthood. He worked as both a cobbler for his father and a grocer. However, his illness kept him from continuing down either of those career paths. His parents died and Sprague could not work enough to support himself, so he was left unemployed. In 1865, he was offered a job at a circus sideshow, where he became known as "the Living Skeleton" or "the Original Thin Man".

The next year P. T. Barnum, the director of the circus, hired Sprague to work at his (newly reopened and successful) American Museum Freak show. Barnum paid Sprague $80 a week for his services. Sprague remembered the moment Barnum offered him the job: "Mr. Barnum stood very near me, and I overheard him say to his agent, 'Pretty lean man, where did you scare him up?

Barnum's Museum burned down in 1868 and Sprague managed to escape with his life. At this point, Sprague took time off to marry his wife, Tamar Moore. They had three sons who lived healthy, normal lives.

Sprague made attempts to stay away from the sideshow, but he could not escape financial distress. It is rumored that in addition to being financially responsible for his wife and their three sons, Sprague had a gambling problem. His condition also kept him from finding real work anywhere other than Barnum's, so he continued to tour off and on throughout the country and eventually overseas.

By the age of 44, he was 5 feet and 6 inches (168 cm) tall with a weight of only 43 pounds (19.5 kg). Sprague's condition required him to be constantly taking in nutrients. His health was in such a poor state that he often carried milk in a flask around his neck. He would sip this from time to time to keep himself up and conscious.

He died on January 5, 1887, in poverty, of asphyxia in Chicago, Illinois.

Sprague was the first of many more Living Skeleton acts to come. In a result of forced promotion and work pressure, it was not uncommon for the Living Skeleton act to marry the Fat Lady act.

Personal life 
Sprague married Miss Tamar Moore shortly after 1868 and the couple had three strong, healthy, robust sons. Sprague found happiness in his family. He described his new found joy, "Life, that had at times seemed so little worth preserving, now seemed more precious."

See also 
 Artie Atherton
 Peter Robinson - "The Living Skeleton"

References

External links
 "The Living Skeleton; He Agrees to Give His Body to Harvard Medical College", New York Times, December 23, 1883.

Sideshow performers
Deaths from asphyxiation
People from East Bridgewater, Massachusetts
1841 births
1887 deaths